William Swain Cleveland II (born 1943) is an American computer scientist and Professor of Statistics and Professor of Computer Science at Purdue University, known for his work on data visualization, particularly on nonparametric regression and local regression.

Biography 
Cleveland obtained his AB in Mathematics mid 1960s from Princeton University, where he graduated under William Feller. For his PhD studies in Statistics he moved to Yale University, where he graduated in 1969 under Leonard Jimmie Savage.

After graduation Cleveland started at Bell Labs, where he was staff member of the Statistics Research Department and Department Head for 12 years. Eventually he moved to the Purdue University, where he became Professor of Statistics and Courtesy Professor of Computer Science.
In 1982 he was elected as a Fellow of the American Statistical Association.

His research interests are in the fields of "data visualization, computer networking, machine learning, data mining, time series, statistical modeling, visual perception, environmental science, and seasonal adjustment." Cleveland is credited with defining and naming the field of data science, which he did in a 2001 publication.

Selected publications 
 Cleveland, William S. The elements of graphing data. Monterey, CA: Wadsworth Advanced Books and Software, 1985.
 Cleveland, William S. Visualizing data. Hobart Press, 1993.

Articles, a selection:
 Cleveland, William S. "Robust locally weighted regression and smoothing scatterplots." Journal of the American statistical association 74.368 (1979): 829–836.
 Cleveland, William S., and Robert McGill. "Graphical perception: Theory, experimentation, and application to the development of graphical methods." Journal of the American statistical association 79.387 (1984): 531–554.
 Cleveland, William S., and Susan J. Devlin. "Locally weighted regression: an approach to regression analysis by local fitting." Journal of the American Statistical Association 83.403 (1988): 596–610.
 Cleveland, William S., Eric Grosse, and William M. Shyu. "Local regression models." Statistical models in S (1992): 309–376.

References

External links 
 William S. Cleveland, Shanti S. Gupta Professor of Statistics, Courtesy Professor of Computer Science
 William Cleveland at the Mathematics Genealogy Project

1943 births
Living people
Human–computer interaction researchers
Information visualization experts
Princeton University alumni
Yale Graduate School of Arts and Sciences alumni
Purdue University faculty
Fellows of the American Statistical Association
Scientists at Bell Labs